Gabriel Ferreira Neris (born 29 October 2001), known as Gabriel Tota, is a Brazilian footballer who plays as a midfielder for Juventude.

Club career
Born in Santa Fé do Sul, São Paulo, Gabriel Tota represented Araçatuba, América-SP,  and Novorizontino as a youth. He made his senior debut while on loan at Rio Preto in 2020.

In 2021, Gabriel Tota moved to Mirassol and returned to the under-20 squad. He first appeared with the main squad on 25 September of that year, starting in a 1–2 Série C home loss against former side Novorizontino.

On 22 January 2022, after impressing in the year's Copa São Paulo de Futebol Júnior, Gabriel Tota was one of the nine players definitely promoted to Mirassol's first team, but moved to Série A side Juventude five days later, on a four-year contract.

Gabriel Tota made his debut for Ju on 3 February 2022, coming on as a second-half substitute for Jadson and scoring the opener in a 1–1 Campeonato Gaúcho home draw against Novo Hamburgo.

Career statistics

References

2001 births
Living people
Footballers from São Paulo (state)
Brazilian footballers
Association football midfielders
Campeonato Brasileiro Série C players
Grêmio Novorizontino players
Rio Preto Esporte Clube players
Mirassol Futebol Clube players
Esporte Clube Juventude players